Hilberg is a surname. Notable people with the surname include:

Isidor Hilberg (1852–1919), Austrian classical scholar
Raul Hilberg (1926–2007), Austrian-born American political scientist and historian

See also
Hilbert (name)